Tereza Krakovičová (née Pecková, ; born 10 July 1987) is a Czech professional basketball player. She plays for Czech Republic women's national basketball team. She competed in the 2012 Summer Olympics where the Czech team came 7th.

References

Living people
Czech women's basketball players
1987 births
Olympic basketball players of the Czech Republic
Basketball players at the 2012 Summer Olympics
Sportspeople from Ústí nad Labem
Forwards (basketball)